Natalie Villalobos is an American advocate for diversity and inclusion, working since 2020 as the Head of Developer Inspiration & Inclusion at Google. She was formerly Google's Head of Global Programs for Women Techmakers  Women Techmakers is an external-facing program supporting women in technology working to improve the visibility and contributions of women at Google, and in particular at the annual developer conference Google I/O.

Education and work 
Natalie received a B.A in history at Sonoma State University in California, US, including one year abroad at the University of Hull, in England.

Early in her career, Natalie worked with the communities at Digg and Yahoo! (MASH and Live) as an Associate Community Manager, and managed StyleMob, a DIY social network for fashion enthusiasts."

From 2008 to 2009 Natalie consulted for the Institute for the Future where she co-led the Signtific Lab, an open source massive multi-player "thought experiment" platform for scientists and technologists to help forecast future disruptions in their fields. And in 2009 she worked as the Arts and Culture Manager for The Seasteading Institute on the development of Ephemerisle - "a floating festival of politics, community, and art".

In 2010 Natalie became the Community Manager for Google+. After working in this role for a couple of years she saw a need to support women in technology and improve their visibility and contributions at their developer conferences and events. In 2013 the position Head of Global Programs for Women Techmakers at Google was created at her request. The team's mission is to provide visibility, community, and resources for women in tech globally, engaging 100,000 women annually across 190 countries.  Since its creation, the team has grown Google's 'Women Techmakers' event from an annual event into a scalable program operating in over 50 countries.

Natalie is also involved in mentoring underrepresented people in tech through her activities as an Advisory Board Member for the Center for Gender and Refugee Studies at UC Hastings Law School, and was an advisor for X Prize Foundation on the Anu & Naveen JainWomen's Safety Prize.

Natalie has authored two patents for Google, and ran a successful viral campaign to save 300 acres of the Amazon rainforest for the Quichua Nation after attending the Google Earth Outreach/Indigenous Mapping Summit.

Recognition 
In 2011 Natalie was promoted as one of 35 personalities to add to your Google+ by The Huffington Post. and one of the top 13 Google insiders to follow on Google+ by Business Insider. And in 2012 was voted one of the Top 20 Women in Tech to Follow on Google+ by CBS News. She is a conference speaker, and was a panelist at The Trilateral Summit on Women’s Leadership in STEM 2020.

External links

References 

Sonoma State University alumni
Google employees
Living people
Place of birth missing (living people)
Year of birth missing (living people)
21st-century American women